In economics, factor payments are the income people receive for supplying the factors of production: land, labor, capital or entrepreneurship.

Payments made of scarce resources, or the factors of production in return for productive services. They are also categorized according to the services of the productive resources being rewarded. As wages are being paid for services of labor, interest is paid for the services of capital, rent is paid for the services provided by the land or other immovable assets and profit is for the factor of payment to entrepreneurship.

An economy is dependent on the production of goods and services, hence factors of production are required for the production of goods and services. They are broadly divided in the three factors of production: land, labor, and capital. Land is the primary factor of production. Labor is the specific factor of production and payment is made in the form of wage. Capital is regarded as secondary factor of production as it can be manipulated by economic activity. Payment received would be in the form of interest. Later Entrepreneurship was added as the fourth factor of production. It earns profit to the entrepreneur.

Factors of production are owned by households and they supply these factors of production to firms and in return earn wages, interest, rent and profit. Households buy goods and services with this money.

Circular flow of national income

Let one study with the help of circular flow of income how flow of goods and services between households and firms is balanced by flow of factor payments made in exchange of them. Consider the circular flow of income in a two-sector economy where there is no government, no capital market, and no foreign sector. Households own all the factors of production: land, labor, capital. These factors of production are sold to the firms to produce goods and services through factor markets. Firms make use of these resources and provide goods and services to the household through product markets. However the exchange of goods and services and factors of production takes place with the help of the financial flows that move in the reverse direction. As the households purchase goods and services from firms it is their consumption expenditure which in turn becomes income or profits for the firms. On the other hand, when firms buy factors of production from the households they pay factor payments in the form of wages, rent, interest.

Factor prices

Distribution of national income is determined by factor payments (factor prices). Factor payments include rent, wages, interest and profit. The prices for factor of production depends upon demand and supply of that particular factor of production. Assume that the factors of production in the economy are fixed and hence the factor supply curve is vertical. Equilibrium of factor payments is determined by the intersection of the downward-sloping factor demand curve and the vertical supply curve. The optimal factor payments are determined through their respective markets i.e. the market clearing prices of the factors of production. There are three major factor of production Land, Labor, Capital.

Labor market
As one knows that the firm will hire only the optimal amount of labor that will maximize profit, this optimal quantity of labor depends upon the marginal product of labor (MPL). The marginal product of labor is defined as the extra unit of output that the firm produces from hiring one extra unit of labor.
          MPL=F(K,L+1)−F(K,L)

The above equation states that Marginal Product of labor is the difference of output produced from one extra unit of labor and the output produced from original quantity of labor. This production function has the function of diminishing marginal product which means that the marginal product of labor decreases as the amount of labor increases, and as the amount of labor increases the production function becomes flatter i.e. diminishing marginal product.

Optimal wages for Labor

The demand for labor is dependent on the theory of marginal product of labor, which means that the firm compares the extra revenue earned from increased production that results from the added labor which ultimately leads to the higher spending on wages.let us understand with the following example
Let  denote wages rate that the labor receives.s denote the hours of labor services that household supplies to labor market. Thus the households receives  samount of income from providing labor services. Now let d denote the labor services that the firm demands from labor market. Thus the firm pays damount of wage for providing labor services. Quantity produced in the economy will be given by  s =d. Thus the firm profit will be given by gross revenue less wage payments.

s-d=d-d

Now if we increase the labor input it has two effects first the output will increase by the marginal product of labor as extra hour of work is provided. Therefore, the gross sales revenue will be given by  second the wage rate for the firm increases by  It is clear that in order to maximize profit firm will expand employment level up to the level where marginal product just equals wage rate.

Now if we divide the above equation with general price level then we obtain

here  is the real wage rate. At that point the contribution done by the last unit of labor will be just equal to output MPL. Thus one can conclude that the wages paid would be equal to the marginal product of labor.

Theory of interest

In the classical theory supply and demand for capital determines the optimal interest rates. The rate of interest that is determined by the intersection  of investment and saving is the price of investible resource (capital). The demand for capital is done by the entrepreneur for further investment and for the productive purpose. But the productivity of capital is dependent on the law of variable proportion. Which means as more and more of capital is employed the productivity from capital goes on decreasing. Therefore, the entrepreneur will employ only capital up to that level where the rate of interest is equal to the Marginal productivity of capital(MPK).
,
where MPK is the marginal productivity of capital and R/P is real rental for capital. It shows that demand for capital is inversely related to rate of interest. There are many other factors which affect the demand for capital. On the other hand, supply of capital is positively related to the rate of interest. As the rate of interest increases the savings increases and vice versa. Thus the entrepreneur will employ the capital where MPK is equal to real price of capital.
The optimal rate of interest rate is determined by the intersection of demand and supply curves. If the rate of interest rises above the equilibrium interest rates the demand for the investment will decline and the supply of savings will increase. As there is excess of savings than demand in the economy the market forces will bring the interest rate to the original interest rates. Now, if the interest rates fall below the optimal level then there is excess of demand than supply in the economy and hence, the market forces will adjust the interest rates.

Theory of rent

This theory was first developed by the economist David Ricardo; it was called The ricardian theory of rent. Ricardo defined rent as "that portion of produced of the earth which is paid to the landlord for the use of the original and indestructible powers of the soil". However, later on the modern theory of rent was developed by the modern economists. The main difference between the Ricardian theory and this theory was that, Ricardian theory used  the difference between surplus enjoyed from superior land to the inferior land. In the modern theory the rent was determined by the demand and supply forces in the market like the other factors of production. Demand for land means total land demanded by the economy as a whole. Demand for land like others depends upon the marginal revenue productivity. Rent paid by the economy will be equal to the marginal revenue productivity which is also subject to law of diminishing returns. This suggests that the demand curve like any other demand curve will be downward sloping. It shows that the demand for land and rent are negatively related. On the other hand, supply of land for an economy is fixed that is it is perfectly inelastic.

Theory of profit
Profit is another important factor in factor payments.
This theory was first developed by Edgeworth, Chapman, Stigler, and Stonier. This theory is also depended upon the marginal revenue productivity.
It is also called marginal product and capital demand. Let one consider an example. The main objective of firm is to maximize profit. As we know that profit would be difference between the revenue and costs.Where the revenue would be equal to the price of the good multiplied by the output of the firm. On the other hand, the costs of the firm include labor costs, capital costs, rent cost if any. Now if we substitute our production function. Then we would see that the profit of the firm is depended on factor prices and factor inputs.
.Hence firm would choose the optimal level of factor inputs that would maximize profit of the firm.

See also

 Economic rent
 IS/LM model
 Law of rent
 Marginal efficiency of capital

References

Factors of production